2011 Copa Governador do Estado da Bahia was the 13th edition of Bahia State Cup, and the third edition as Copa Governador do Estado da Bahia. Eight teams participated in the tournament.

The winner qualified for 2012 Campeonato Brasileiro Série D.

Format
The clubs were divided into two groups of four. The top two teams of each group advanced to the semifinals.

Participating teams
Alagoinhas
Bahia de Feira
Vitória da Conquista
Bahia
Vitória
Feirense
Itabuna
Serrano

First stage

Group 1

Group 2

References

External links
 http://www.fbfweb.org/

2011 Brazilian football competitions